Comoros–France relations are the bilateral relations between the Union of the Comoros and the French Republic.

The Comoros has an embassy in Paris and France has an embassy in Moroni.

Comoros lays claim to Mayotte, an overseas department and region of France.

The Comoros and France share a maritime border via the French Southern and Antarctic Lands.

See also
 Foreign relations of the Comoros
 Foreign relations of France

References

 
France
Comoros
Relations of colonizer and former colony